Prunus rubiginosa is a species of plant in the family Rosaceae. It is endemic to the Philippines.

References

Sources

Flora of the Philippines
rubiginosa
Endangered plants
Taxonomy articles created by Polbot